Adelayo Adedayo (born 18 December 1988) is a British actress. Her first television appearance was in The Bill, and she made her film debut in Sket. She later starred as Viva Bennett in Some Girls on BBC Three.

Early life
Adedayo is from Dagenham. She trained part-time at Identity School of Acting while studying Law at Brunel University.

Filmography

Film

Television

References

External links 
 

British actresses
21st-century British actresses
Living people
Year of birth missing (living people)
Actresses from Manchester
Alumni of Brunel University London
Black British actresses
English television actresses
English people of Yoruba descent
People from Dagenham
Yoruba people
21st-century English women
21st-century English people